Chamaesphecia minoica is a moth of the family Sesiidae. It is found on Crete.

References

Moths described in 2005
Sesiidae
Moths of Europe
Fauna of Crete